Santeny is a commune in the southeastern suburbs of Paris, France.

Transport
Santeny is served by no station of the Paris Métro, RER, or suburban rail network. The closest station to Santeny is Boissy-Saint-Léger station on Paris RER line A. This station is located in the commune of Boissy-Saint-Léger,  from the town center of Santeny.

Population

Education
Santeny has one consolidated preschool/nursery (maternelle) and elementary school: Groupe scolaire des 40 Arpents. The commune also has Collège Georges-Brassens, a public junior high school.

Area senior high schools/sixth-form colleges:
 Lycée Guillaume-Budé - Limeil-Brévannes
 Lycée Christophe-Colomb - Sucy-en-Brie
 Lycée des métiers hôteliers Montaleau - Sucy-en-Brie

See also
Communes of the Val-de-Marne department

References

External links

 Home page 

Communes of Val-de-Marne